Thiobaca is a phototrophic and motile genus of bacteria from the family of Chromatiaceae with one known species (Thiobaca trueperi). Thiobaca trueperi has been isolated from sediments from a eutrophic lake.

References

Chromatiales
Bacteria genera
Monotypic bacteria genera
Taxa described in 2002